The 2009 Women's Hockey Champions Challenge I is the fifth tournament of the field hockey championship for women. It was held from October 11 to October 18, 2009 in Cape Town, South Africa. The tournament was won by New Zealand and promoted to the Champions Trophy in 2011.

Results
All times are South African Standard Time (UTC+02:00)

Preliminary round

Pool A

Pool B

Classification round

Pool C

Pool D

Classification matches

Fifth and sixth place

Third and fourth place

Final

Awards

Statistics

Final standings

Goalscorers

References

External links
Official FIH website
Official website

Women's Hockey Champions Challenge I
Champions Challenge I
International women's field hockey competitions hosted by South Africa
Sports competitions in Cape Town
Hockey Champions Challenge
Hockey Champions Challenge
2000s in Cape Town